WTHQ is a Contemporary Hit Radio formatted broadcast radio station licensed to Point Pleasant, West Virginia, serving Point Pleasant and Mason County in West Virginia.  WTHQ is owned and operated by Baker Family Stations.

History
Prior to March 25, 2016, WTHQ was Southern Gospel formatted WBGS.  The station simulcast on 105.9, the former frequency of translator W290BC.  W290BC moved from 105.9 to 94.1 as W231CY on March 25 as well.

Translator
In addition to the main station, WTHQ is relayed by an FM translator to widen its broadcast area.

References

External links
 94Q FM Online

1994 establishments in West Virginia
Contemporary hit radio stations in the United States
Radio stations established in 1994
THQ
Point Pleasant, West Virginia
THQ